François Protat (1945 - January 18, 2019) was a Canadian cinematographer, who won the Genie Award for Best Cinematography at the 7th Genie Awards in 1986 for Joshua Then and Now. Born in France, he emigrated to Canada in 1969 after studying at the École de photographie de la rue de Vaugirard.

He was also a Genie Award nominee at the 2nd Genie Awards in 1981 for Fantastica, at the 6th Genie Awards in 1985 for The Crime of Ovide Plouffe, and at the 15th Genie Awards in 1994 for Kabloonak.

He was married to Marie-Angèle Breitner, a hairstylist and make-up artist who also worked in film.

His death was reported on January 22, 2019.

Selected filmography
Bingo - 1974
Orders (Les Ordres) - 1974
Normande (La tête de Normande St-Onge) - 1975
The Angel and the Woman (L'Ange et la femme) - 1977
Jacob Two-Two Meets the Hooded Fang - 1978
Tomorrow Never Comes - 1978
Chocolate Eclair (Éclair au chocolat) - 1979
Bye, See You Monday (Au revoir à lundi) - 1979
Heartbreak (L'arrache-cœur) - 1979
Fantastica - 1980
The Plouffe Family (Les Plouffe) - 1981
Heartbreak High - 1981
Tulips - 1981
The Hot Touch - 1981
Scandale - 1982
Killing 'em Softly - 1982
Between Friends - 1983
Running Brave - 1983
The Dog Who Stopped the War (La Guerre des tuques) - 1984
The Surrogate - 1984
The Crime of Ovide Plouffe (Le Crime d'Ovide Plouffe) - 1984
Joshua Then and Now - 1985
Separate Vacations - 1986
Switching Channels - 1988
Weekend at Bernie's - 1989
Beautiful Dreamers - 1990
Clearcut - 1991
The Diamond Fleece - 1992
Kabloonak - 1994
Johnny Mnemonic - 1995

References

External links

Canadian cinematographers
French emigrants to Canada
Best Cinematography Genie and Canadian Screen Award winners
2019 deaths
1945 births